Vozokany is a village and municipality with 324 inhabitants in the Topoľčany District of the Nitra Region, Slovakia. In 2011 the village had 328 inhabitants.

References

External links
http://en.e-obce.sk/obec/vozokanyga/vozokany.html
http://www.obecvozokany.sk

Villages and municipalities in Topoľčany District